Sabia Abbat is a Pakistani professional cyclist.

Background 
Abbat was born in Haripur, Khyber Pakhtunkhwa and holds a bachelor's degree in Physical education.

Career 
It was unusual in her hometown to participate in sports. However, Sabia was passionate about sports from an early age. In 2011, Sadia witnessed a women's cycling competition in Pania where the women were unable to ride a bike properly. This inspired Sabia to learn to ride a bicycle. Sadia took her uncle's bicycle to practice on. She was unable to ride it in the start and fell many times before she could finally ride it. Sabia travelled to Lahore for training because of lack of facilities. Sabia became the first woman from Hazara division to win the National Cycling Championship in 2013.  She has also represented Pakistan in the Asian games.

References 

Pakistani female cyclists
People from Haripur District
Year of birth missing (living people)
Living people